Pierre Feidt (born 13 January 1904, date of death unknown) was a Luxembourgian boxer. He competed in the men's middleweight event at the 1924 Summer Olympics.

References

External links
 

1904 births
Year of death missing
Luxembourgian male boxers
Olympic boxers of Luxembourg
Boxers at the 1924 Summer Olympics
Place of birth missing
Middleweight boxers